The Women's team normal hill competition at the FIS Nordic World Ski Championships 2023 was held on 25 February 2023.

Results
The first round was started at 12:15 and the final round at 13:17.

References

Women's team normal hill